Áine Rose Daly is a British actress and singer-songwriter who has appeared in films and television.

She played Annabelle Schenkel in the Amazon Prime series Tom Clancy's Jack Ryan in 2018, and in 2020 she appeared as Sandy (previously known as 'Girl 242') in the second season of Hanna. She appeared as a waitress in both the short and feature-length versions of Philip Barantini's one-shot film Boiling Point, which premiered at the 55th Karlovy Vary International Film Festival in August 2021 and released in British cinemas in 2022.

In 2021 she appeared in the American-French gothic horror The Cursed.
She is also a singer/songwriter. She has released the singles "Miles" and "Places", the latter dealing with issues surrounding mental health.

References

External links

21st-century British actors
Jersey actresses
British songwriters
Living people
Year of birth missing (living people)